Dicotylichthys punctulatus also known as the Three-bar porcupinefish is a species of porcupinefish endemic to the east coast of Australia, where it is found in coastal and offshore reef environments down to  deep. This species is the only known member of its genus.

References

Diodontidae
Monotypic fish genera
Fish of Australia
Fish described in 1855
Taxa named by Johann Jakob Kaup